Rogatywka (sometimes translated as peaked cap) is the Polish generic name for an asymmetrical, peaked, four-pointed cap used by various Polish military formations throughout the ages. It is a distant relative of its 18th-century predecessor, the konfederatka (because of use by members of the Bar Confederation), although similar caps have been used by light cavalry since the 14th century. It consists of a four-pointed top and a short peak, usually made of black or brown leather. Although rogatywka (derived from róg which means "horn" or "corner") in English seems to mean the same as czapka, the word czapka in Polish designates not only rogatywka, but all caps (not hats).

Konfederatka
The konfederatka was based on the hats of the 18th-century Lithuanian Tatar National costumes, as the Grand Ducal Lithuanian Army's Vanguard regiments were heavily influenced by the Lithuanian Tatar dress, among other elements.

Usage
The rogatywka usually comes in two variants: the hardened and soft version. 
The hardened model, based on the rogatywka Mk. 1935, olive green with black peak, is used in full gala uniforms, and the rim colour marks unit type (for example, navy blue – typical, scarlet – military police, green – artillery, and so on). It was not worn during most of the People's Republic of Poland era but was reintroduced for ceremonial wear by the Honour Guard Company in 1983. The soft version was used before World War II and during the People's Republic of Poland period for garrison dress; it was withdrawn after 1990.

Polish soldiers decorate their caps not with the emblem of their corps, but with their service's version of the Polish military eagle. The military eagle insignia is based on an early 19th-century design, comprising a modified White Eagle (from the Polish coat of arms) perched atop an "Amazon shield".

Army branches are indicated by the following colored cap bands:
 Navy blue – generals, mechanized troops, National Honour Guard
 Brown – staff officers
 Orange – units dedicated to honour history, armoured troops, scouts
 Dark green – rocket forces, artillery, anti-aircraft units
 Sky blue – army aviation (helicopters)
 Red – intelligence
 Maroon – transportation 
 Bronze – civil affairs
 Purple – quartermaster corps, supply and logistics
 Tan – ordnance 
 Black – engineering units, chemical corps, cartographic service, technical cadets
 Silver – special forces 
 Cornflower – adjutant general corps, radio and communication corps
 White – infantry 
 Blue – paratroopers
 Beige- recruit and retention
 Cherry – medical service, medical cadets
 Salmon – legal services
 Mauve – public affairs 
 Goldenrod – military bands 
 Scarlet – military police
 Gold – accounting and finance
 Violet – chaplains
 Yellow – headquarters of 1st Warsaw Mechanized Division, 1st Warsaw Armoured Division

Others
The rogatywka is used by Polish firefighters (hardened, all navy blue) and Polish State Railways staff (soft, navy blue or red).

Green rogatywkas with brown leather peak and scout Fleur-de-lis symbol are traditionally worn by Polish boy scouts, while grey caps are sometimes used by girl guides.

References

Caps
Polish military traditions
Military uniforms
Military hats